Kate Jackson (born 13 August 1986) is a British retired mixed martial artist, most notable for fighting for Bellator MMA, where she challenged for the promotion's flyweight championship, and on The Ultimate Fighter 23, losing to eventual TUF 23 winner Tatiana Suarez.

Background 
Having done karate since 2001 and judo from 2002 since the age of 15, Jackson kept going with whatever martial arts she could find at university, be it traditional jiujitsu, kickboxing and occasional BJJ classes. She found an MMA gym, Koncept, in Newquay Cornwall in 2008, and that’s when her interest and future career in MMA started.

Mixed martial arts career

Early career 
Jackson made her MMA debut on 10 May 2009, earning a TKO victory over Kate Rennie. She would win four of her first five professional fights, before suffering her second career loss against future UFC women's strawweight champion Joanna Jedrzejczyk.

The Ultimate Fighter 23 
Competing at strawweight, Jackson appeared on the 23rd season of The Ultimate Fighter in 2016, where she was a member of Team Gadelha, coached by Claudia Gadelha. In an interesting coincidence, the coach of the opposing team was Joanna Jedrzejczyk, against whom Jackson had previously competed.

Jackson defeated Irene Cabello by TKO to gain entry into the TUF house. She defeated Ashley Yoder via unanimous decision to advance to the semifinal round. There, Jackson was defeated by Tatiana Suarez by submission.

Bellator MMA 

Following her stint on The Ultimate Fighter 23, Jackson returned to the regional scene in her native England for a single fight before being signed by Bellator MMA in 2017 to compete in their women's flyweight division. She won her promotional debut at Bellator 182, defeating Colleen Schneider.

In her second fight for the promotion, Jackson faced Valerie Letourneau at Bellator 191 in December 2017. She lost the fight by a unanimous decision.

In her third fight for the promotion, Jackson faced an undefeated Russian prospect, Anastasia Yankova at Bellator 200 on 25 May 2018. She won the fight via unanimous decision.

Jackson next fought Lena Ovchynnikova at Bellator 223 on 22 June 2019. She won the fight by TKO in the first round.

On the strength of her two fight win streak, Jackson was selected as the next title challenger for the Bellator Women's Flyweight World Championship against champion Ilima-Lei Macfarlane. The fight was the main event of Bellator 236 in Honolulu, Hawaii on 21 December 2019. Jackson lost the fight via unanimous decision.

Jackson faced Denise Kielholtz at Bellator 247 on 1 October 2020. She lost the bout via knockout just 43 seconds into the first round.

Jackson faced Elina Kallionidou on May 13, 2022 at Bellator 281. She lost the bout via TKO stoppage due to ground and pound at the end of the second round.

Mixed martial arts record 

|-
|Loss
|align=center|11–6–1
|Elina Kallionidou
|TKO (punches)
|Bellator 281
|
|align=center|2
|align=center|4:53
|London, England
|
|-
|Loss
|align=center|11–5–1
|Denise Kielholtz
|KO (punches)
|Bellator 247
|
|align=center|1
|align=center|0:43
|Milan, Italy
|
|-
|Loss
|align=center|11–4–1
|Ilima-Lei Macfarlane
|Decision (unanimous)
|Bellator 236
|
|align=center|5
|align=center|5:00
|Honolulu, Hawaii, United States
|
|-
|Win
|align=center|11–3–1
|Lena Ovchynnikova
|TKO (doctor stoppage)
|Bellator 223
|
|align=center|1
|align=center|4:21
|London, England
|
|-
|Win
|align=center|
|Anastasia Yankova
|Decision (unanimous)
|Bellator 200
|
|align=center|3
|align=center|5:00
|London, England
|
|-
|Loss
|align=center|9–3–1
|Valerie Letourneau
|Decision (unanimous)
|Bellator 191
|
|align=center|3
|align=center|5:00
|Newcastle, England
|
|-
|Win
|align=center|9–2–1
|Colleen Schneider
|TKO (knee injury)
|Bellator 182
|
|align=center|1
|align=center|5:00
|Verona, New York, United States
|
|-
|Win
|align=center|8–2–1
|Bryony Tyrell
|TKO (punches)
|British Challenge MMA 18
|
|align=center|3
|align=center|3:43
|Essex, England
|
|-
|Win
|align=center|7–2–1
|Linn Wennergren
|Decision (split)
|LFN 13
|
|align=center|3
|align=center|5:00
|Lappeenranta, Finland
|
|-
|Win
|align=center|6–2–1
|Eeva Siiskonen
|Submission (guillotine choke)
|LFN 12
|
|align=center|3
|align=center|4:59
|Lappeenranta, Finland
|
|-
|Win
|align=center|5–2–1
|Paulina Bonkowska
|TKO (knees and punches)
|Cage Warriors Fighting Championship 72
|
|align=center|1
|align=center|4:05
|Newport, Wales
|
|-
|Draw
|align=center|4–2–1
|Vuokko Katainen
|Draw (split)
|LFN 10
|
|align=center|3
|align=center|5:00
|Lappeenranta, Finland
|
|-
|Loss
|align=center|4–2
|Joanna Jedrzejczyk
|TKO (retirement)
|PLMMA 17 Extra: Warmia Heroes
|
|align=center|2
|align=center|5:00
|Olsztyn, Poland
|
|-
|Win
|align=center|4–1
|Chloe Hinchliffe
|Decision (unanimous)
|Tear Up 9
|
|align=center|3
|align=center|5:00
|Bristol, England
|
|-
|Win
|align=center|3–1
|Paula Ralph
|TKO (punches)
|Tear Up 8
|
|align=center|1
|align=center|0:24
|Bristol, England
|
|-
|Loss
|align=center|2–1
|Hanna Sillen
|Decision (unanimous)
|The Zone FC 9: Unbreakable
|
|align=center|3
|align=center|5:00
|Gothenburg, Sweden
|
|-
|Win
|align=center|2–0
|Fay Ridgeway
|Decision (unanimous)
|Head to Head: The Big Guns
|
|align=center|3
|align=center|5:00
|Somerset, England
|
|-
|Win
|align=center|1–0
|Kate Rennie
|TKO (punches)
|HOP 11: Taking Over
|
|align=center|1
|align=center|0:48
|Newport, England
|
|}

|-
|Loss
|align=center|2–1
| Tatiana Suarez
| Submission (guillotine choke)
|rowspan=3 |The Ultimate Fighter: Team Joanna vs. Team Cláudia
|  (airdate)
|align=center|1
|align=center|2:52
|rowspan=3 |Las Vegas, Nevada, United States
|
|-
|Win
|align=center|2–0
| Ashley Yoder
| Decision (unanimous)
| (airdate)
|align=center|2
|align=center|5:00
|
|-
|Win
|align=center|1–0
| Irene Cabello
| TKO (punches)
| (airdate)
|align=center|2
|align=center|4:48
|

See also 

 List of female mixed martial artists

References

External links 
 
 

1986 births
Living people
English female mixed martial artists
Flyweight mixed martial artists
Mixed martial artists utilizing karate
Mixed martial artists utilizing jujutsu
Mixed martial artists utilizing judo
Mixed martial artists utilizing Brazilian jiu-jitsu
English female karateka
English female judoka
English jujutsuka
English practitioners of Brazilian jiu-jitsu
Female Brazilian jiu-jitsu practitioners
Bellator female fighters